The 1999 Allan Cup was the Canadian senior ice hockey championship for the 1998–99 senior "AAA" season.  The event was hosted by the Stony Plain Eagles in Stony Plain, Alberta.  The 1999 tournament marked the 91st time that the Allan Cup has been awarded.

Teams
Lloydminster Border Kings (West)
London MacMaster Chevys (East)
Powell River Regals (Pacific)
Stony Plain Eagles (Host)

Results
Round Robin
Powell River Regals 7 - Lloydminster Border Kings 1
Stony Plain Eagles 8 - London MacMaster Chevys 3
Powell River Regals 8 - London MacMaster Chevys 1
Lloydminster Border Kings 3 - Stony Plain Eagles 3
Lloydminster Border Kings 4 - London MacMaster Chevys 3
Stony Plain Eagles 5 - Powell River Regals 3
Semi-final
Powell River Regals 5 - Lloydminster Border Kings 3
Final
Stony Plain Eagles 6 - Powell River Regals 3

External links
Allan Cup archives 
Allan Cup website

Allan Cup
Allan Cup